The Gay Financial Network was created by Walter Schubert in April 1998. It aims to single out businesses which practice discrimination on the basis of sexual orientation. It was the first gay-specific company to be advertised in The Wall Street Journal, on February 18, 2000 and has been seen as an example of the merging of gay activism with gay marketing.

References

External links
 Archive home page Gay Financial Network
Organizations established in 1998
LGBT business organizations

Defunct LGBT organizations in the United States